Two Seats at the Opera is a 1916 American silent short comedy directed and starring William Garwood.

Cast
 William J. Welsh as Dr. Jones
 William J. Dyer as Mr. Osgood
 Inez Marcel

External links
 

1916 comedy films
1916 films
Silent American comedy films
American silent short films
American black-and-white films
1916 short films
American comedy short films
1910s American films